Laura Linnea Jensen (born November 16, 1948 in Tacoma, Washington) is an American poet.

She graduated from the University of Washington in Seattle, where she studied with David Wagoner, Mark Strand, and Galway Kinnell, and from the Iowa Writers' Workshop with an MFA in 1974, where she studied with Norman Dubie, Donald Justice, and Marvin Bell.  She became friends with Tess Gallagher.

Her work appeared in Ploughshares.
She read at Burning Word 2005.
She lives near Wright Park, Tacoma, Washington.

Awards
1989 Guggenheim Fellowship
NEA fellowship
Washington State Arts Commission grant

Works
"Sarge"; "Steve Allen", Salt River Review, Volume 6, Number 1, Winter, 2002–2003
"The Red Dog", Nothing to Say and Saying It, September 6, 2006
Shelter Dragon Gate, 1985 
Memory, Dragon Gate, 1982, ; Carnegie Mellon University Press, 2006, 
Bad boats, Ecco Press, 1977; ECCO Press, 1984

Chapbooks
Sky Empty of Orion, 1985
The Story Makes Them Whole, Porch Publications, 1979
Tapwater: poems, Graywolf Press, 1978
Anxiety and ashes: poems, Penumbra Press, 1976
After I Have Voted, Gemini 1972

References

External links
Author's blog
Joe Anistranski: “Laura Jensen’s Bad Boats”, Contemporary Poetry: a web symposium Spring 2006
"Bad Boats by LAURA JENSEN, Recovered by JASON STUMPF", Octopus Magazine, Issue 7
"A Shelter, A Kingdom, A Half Promised Land: Three Poets In Mid-Career", Virginia Quarterly Review, Summer 1987, pp. 426–436

1948 births
Living people
Writers from Tacoma, Washington
University of Washington alumni
Iowa Writers' Workshop alumni
National Endowment for the Arts Fellows
American women poets
21st-century American women